Rodrigo Mundaca is a Chilean politician and environmental activist. He is currently governor of Valparaíso Region. Mundaca has been director and spokesperson of the environmental organization Modatima. In 2017 he and his partner Verónica Vilches claim to have received death threats for their activism against unfair water extraction by landowners. 

In 2019 he won the Nuremberg International Human Rights Award.

References

Living people
1961 births
Chilean environmentalists